The Zionist Federation of Germany also known as the Zionist Association for Germany was a Zionist organisation in Germany that was formed in 1897 in Cologne by Max Bodenheimer. It had attracted 10,000 members by 1914 and was by far the largest Zionist organisation in Germany. The group supported the 1933 Haavara Agreement between Nazi Germany and German Zionist Jews which was designed to encourage German Jews to emigrate to Palestine. They also opposed the Anti-Nazi boycott of 1933 fearing that it could make the Nazi boycott of Jewish businesses worse.

Presidents 
 Max Bodenheimer (1894–1910)
Arthur Hantke (1910–1920)
 Felix Rosenblüth (1920–1923)
 Alfred Landsberg (1923–1924)
 Kurt Blumenfeld (1924–1933)
  (1933–1937)
 , since 1936 per pro

References

Zionism in Germany
Jewish emigration from Nazi Germany
1897 establishments in Germany
Zionist organizations
Jewish organisations based in Germany